Nestlé Pure Life is a brand of bottled water from Nestlé Waters globally and BlueTriton Brands in North America. The brand was first established in 1998 in Pakistan and is now available in 21 countries in Asia, the Americas, Africa, and Europe. In early April 2021, the sale of Nestlé Waters North America's bottling operations, including Nestlé Pure Life, to One Rock Capital Partners LLC and Metropoulos & Co. was concluded.

History
Nestlé Pure Life was first launched in 1998 in Pakistan. In 2000, Nestlé Pure Life started being sold in Europe.

North America
Nestlé Pure Life began being sold in the North America in 2002 when Aberfoyle Springs branded water, which brand and facilities Nestlé bought in 2000, was rebranded as Nestlé Pure Life Aberfoyle and later Nestlé Pure Life Natural Spring Water. Aberfoyle Springs was first established in 1993. Nestlé also began to bottle Montclair branded water at the facilities. As of mid 2020, the water extracted by Nestlé Canada was from a source in Aberfoyle, Ontario,  a well in Erin, Ontario and another in Hope, British Columbia. The company also owned well in Elora, Ontario which had yet to be tapped.

On 3 July 2020, Nestlé Canada announced that it had agreed to sell its water bottling business to Ice River Springs, of Shelburne, Ontario. The latter would acquire the source and bottling operations in Aberfoyle, Ontario and in Hope, British Columbia, and a well in Erin, Ontario. The announcement came after the Government of Ontario announced plans that would allow municipalities greater power to veto new bottling plants and to set new restrictions on removing groundwater. Nestlé, however, stated that its plans to sell the water bottling business was already in the planning stages in 2019. Ice River was expected to take over the Pure Life brand and the ReadyRefresh delivery service. The deal was awaiting regulator approval which was not achieved in a timely manner leading Nestlé to cancel the deal in early September 2020. 

On 16 February 2021, Nestlé announced that it had agreed to sell most of its water brands in North America to One Rock Capital Partners and Metropoulos & Co, creating BlueTriton Brands. The sale, which concluded in early April, included the spring water and mountain brands, including the North America assets of Pure Life, the purified water brand and the delivery service. The deal did not include the Perrier, S.Pellegrino and Acqua Panna brands.

Production and distribution 
In Canada, Nestlé has two bottling facilities that produce Nestlé Pure Life branded water, the larger of the two is located in Aberfoyle, Ontario and the smaller one is in Hope, BC. Warehouses are located in Chilliwack, British Columbia, Hamilton, Ontario and Laval, Quebec. Nestlé Pure Life water is sold in North America, South America, Europe, Asia, including the Middle East, and Africa.

Controversy 

Nestlé has been criticized for bottling water in poor regions like South America, which could drain natural water sources and deprive people who can't afford the expensive bottled water. The movie Bottled Life documented the situation and won several film awards.

In Canada, much of the water extracted by the company for its Pure Life brand has been at a source in the village of Aberfoyle, Ontario in Puslinch, Ontario, located in Wellington County, Ontario and under the jurisdiction of the City of Guelph, Ontario. For some years, a local advocacy group, Wellington Water Watchers has expressed concern about the amount of water being extracted by the company. Formed in 2007, the group's mandate is "the protection, restoration and conservation of drinking water in Guelph and Wellington County".

After the planned sale of the Nestlé Canada's water bottling business to Ice River Springs was announced in early July 2020, Wellington Water Watchers said that this was "a victory for the people of Ontario ... a response by Nestle to public pressure". In a later statement, however, a spokesperson said that Ontario should be phasing out the bottled water industry, a "low priority and frivolous use of the water taking".  

Nearly a year earlier (July 2019), the Wellington group had demanded that the provincial government obtain an environmental assessment before renewing the company's licence to remove any groundwater. (Water taking is controlled by the Ontario Ministry of the Environment, Conservation and Parks.) At the time, Nestlé’s permit to extract up to 3.6 million litres of water per day was close to coming up for renewal.

The most recent study (reported in March 2020) by the City of Guelph about the Aberfoyle source included this comment: Nestlé’s water-taking "has not caused a decline or drop in water levels year after year" and that "water-taking at the current rate is sustainable at this point in time".

See also
 Dasani
 Aquafina
 Poland Spring
 Pulmuone

References

External links
 

1998 establishments in Pakistan
Bottled water brands
BlueTriton brands
Nestlé brands